Franco Nicolás Canever (born 17 September 1989) is an Argentine professional footballer who plays as a defender for Club Atlético Güemes.

Career

Club
Canever's first club was Primera B Nacional team Instituto, his spell with the club started in 2008 and ended in 2013. During his time with Instituto, he made 95 league appearances and scored 2 goals. In August 2012, Canever spent time away from Instituto as he joined Argentinos Juniors on loan for the 2012–13 Argentine Primera División season. However, his spell with Argentinos Juniors was short as on 8 January 2013, despite starting two of the club's first three league fixtures, he returned to his parent club in January 2013. He left Instituto in July of the same year and subsequently joined Atlético Tucumán, his Atlético Tucumán debut came on 4 August in a win against Gimnasia de Jujuy. 24 appearances in all competitions followed before he moved clubs once again, this time joining Aldosivi. He made his debut for the club on 9 August 2014 against Nueva Chicago.

Career statistics

Club
.

References

External links
 
 
 
 
 
 
 

1989 births
Living people
Argentine footballers
Association football defenders
Argentine Primera División players
Primera Nacional players
Instituto footballers
Argentinos Juniors footballers
Atlético Tucumán footballers
Aldosivi footballers
Footballers from Córdoba, Argentina